Zarkak may refer to:
 Zarkak, Fariman
 Zarkak, Torbat-e Heydarieh